The name Gonzalo has been used for two tropical cyclones in the Atlantic Ocean. The name replaced the name Gustav, which was retired after the 2008 hurricane season.
 
 Hurricane Gonzalo (2014), a powerful Category 4 hurricane that made landfall in Bermuda.
 Tropical Storm Gonzalo (2020), the earliest seventh named storm on record, becoming a moderate tropical storm before weakening and hitting Trinidad and Tobago as a tropical depression.
 

Atlantic hurricane set index articles